The three teams in this group played against each other on a home-and-away basis. Sweden and Switzerland finished level on points and advanced to a play-off on neutral ground to decide who would qualify. The winner (Switzerland) qualified for the seventh FIFA World Cup held in Chile.

Standings

Matches

 

 

 

 

 

Sweden and Switzerland finished level on points, and a play-off on neutral ground was played to decide who would qualify.

References

External links
FIFA official page
RSSSF – 1962 World Cup Qualification
Allworldcup

1
1960 in Swedish football
1961 in Swedish football
1960–61 in Belgian football
1961–62 in Belgian football
1960–61 in Swiss football
qual